Stepping Lively is a 1924 American silent action film directed by James W. Horne and starring Richard Talmadge, Mildred Harris and Norval MacGregor.

Plot

Cast
 Richard Talmadge as Dave Allen 
 Mildred Harris as Evelyn Pendroy 
 Norval MacGregor as James Pendroy 
 Brinsley Shaw as Robbins 
 Fred Kelsey as Detective Artemus Doolittle 
 Mario Carillo as Josef Le Baron 
 William Clifford as Black Mike 
 John Webb Dillion as Detective Dan Carter 
 Victor Metzetti as Chicago Red

References

Bibliography
 Munden, Kenneth White. The American Film Institute Catalog of Motion Pictures Produced in the United States, Part 1. University of California Press, 1997.

External links
 

1924 films
1920s action films
American silent feature films
American action films
Films directed by James W. Horne
American black-and-white films
Film Booking Offices of America films
1920s English-language films
1920s American films